This is a list of compositions by John Williams.

Film scores
The following list consists of select films for which John Williams composed the score and/or songs.

1950s

1960s

1970s

1980s

1990s

2000s

2010s

2020s

The Olympics
Williams has composed music for four Olympic Games:
 "Olympic Fanfare and Theme" – 1984 Summer Olympics, Los Angeles
 Written specifically for the opening ceremonies. In a 1996 re-release, the opening trumpet fanfare was replaced with "Bugler's Dream", a previous Olympic Theme written by Leo Arnaud. This recording has been used as the theme for NBC's Olympic coverage ever since. Williams received a Grammy for Best Instrumental Composition.
 "The Olympic Spirit" – 1988 Summer Olympics, Seoul
 Commissioned by NBC Sports for their television coverage. Williams received a Grammy nomination for Best Instrumental Composition.
 "Summon the Heroes" – 1996 Summer Olympics, Atlanta, Georgia
 Written in commemoration of the Centennial of the Modern Olympic Games. Premiering on July 19, 1996, the piece features heavy use of the brass and wind sections and is approximately six minutes in length. Principal Boston Pops trumpeter Timothy Morrison played the opening solo on the album recording. It has been arranged for various types of ensembles, including wind ensembles. This theme is now used prevalently by NBC for intros and outros to commercial breaks of the Olympics.
 "Call of the Champions" – 2002 Winter Olympics, Salt Lake City, Utah

Television

 For NBC (United States):
 NBC News – "The Mission"
 NBC Nightly News
 The Today Show
 Meet the Press
 NBC Sunday Night Football

Miscellaneous
1980: Williams' Jaws theme briefly used in Airplane! scored by Elmer Bernstein
1980: Williams' Superman theme used in Superman II scored by Ken Thorne.
1983: Williams' Superman theme also used in Superman III also scored by Ken Thorne.
1983: Williams' Jaws theme used in Jaws 3-D scored by Alan Parker
1984: Williams' Superman theme used in Supergirl scored by Jerry Goldsmith.
1984: Williams' "Parade of the Ewoks" theme from Star Wars: Return of the Jedi used in The Ewok Adventure scored by Peter Bernstein.
1985: Williams' "Parade of the Ewoks" theme from Star Wars: Return of the Jedi also used in Ewoks: The Battle for Endor also scored by Peter Bernstein.
1987: Williams' Jaws theme used in Jaws: The Revenge scored by Michael Small.
2001: Williams' Jurassic Park theme used in Jurassic Park III scored by Don Davis.
2002: Williams' "The Imperial March" from Star Wars: The Empire Strikes Back briefly used in French film Asterix & Obelix: Mission Cleopatra.
2005: Williams' Indiana Jones theme briefly appears during a scene of a Oakey Oaks theather showing Raiders of the Lost Ark the Walt Disney Animation Studios feature film Chicken Little scored by John Debney.
2005: Williams' Harry Potter theme used in Harry Potter and the Goblet of Fire scored by Patrick Doyle.
2006: Williams' Superman theme used in Superman Returns scored by John Ottman.
2007: Williams' Harry Potter theme used in Harry Potter and the Order of the Phoenix scored by Nicholas Hooper.
2008-2020: Williams' Star Wars themes frequently used in Star Wars: The Clone Wars scored by Kevin Kiner.
2009: Williams' Harry Potter theme used in Harry Potter and the Half-Blood Prince scored by Nicholas Hooper.
2010: Williams' Harry Potter theme used in Harry Potter and the Deathly Hallows Part 1 scored by Alexandre Desplat.
2011: Williams' Harry Potter theme also used in Harry Potter and the Deathly Hallows Part 2 also scored by Alexandre Desplat.
2014-2018: Williams' Star Wars themes frequently used in Star Wars Rebels scored by Kevin Kiner.
2015: Williams' Jurassic Park theme used in Jurassic World scored by Michael Giacchino.
2016: Williams' Harry Potter theme used in Fantastic Beasts and Where to Find Them scored by James Newton Howard
2016: Williams' Star Wars themes used in Rogue One: A Star Wars Story scored by Michael Giacchino.
2017: Danny Elfman chose to use Williams' Superman theme for Henry Cavill's version of Superman in the DC Extended Universe film Justice League.
2018: Williams' Lost in Space theme used in 2018 adaptation scored by Christopher Lennertz.
2018: Williams' Jurassic Park theme used in Jurassic World: Fallen Kingdom scored by Michael Giacchino.
2018: Williams' "The Imperial March" from Star Wars: The Empire Strikes Back briefly used in the Walt Disney Animation Studios feature film Ralph Breaks The Internet scored by Henry Jackman when Vanellope Von Schweetz runs away from First Order stormtroopers on OhMyDisney.com website.
2019: Williams' Superman theme briefly appears at the end of the film when Superman goes to lunch with Shazam and his foster brothers in the DC Extended Universe film Shazam!.
2019: Williams' Superman theme, specifically the tracks selected by Blake Neely, briefly appears when Superman meets Iris West-Allen, Superman and Lois Lane when they find him on Earth-96 in the Batwoman episode "Crisis on Infinite Earths: Part Two", which is part of the Arrowverse.
2020: Williams' Amazing Stories theme used in 2020 version.
2020: Williams' Star Wars themes briefly used in the Disney+ original series The Mandalorian Season 2 scored by Ludwig Göransson.
2021: Williams' Harry Potter theme briefly appears when an animated LeBron James appears dressed as Harry Potter during the Warner 3000 presentation scene in the Looney Tunes film Space Jam: A New Legacy.
2021-2022: Williams' Star Wars themes briefly used in the Disney+ original series The Book of Boba Fett scored by Ludwig Göransson.
2022: Williams' Indiana Jones theme briefly appears when Chip 'n' Dale crash into an Indiana Jones exhibition booth in the Disney+ original film Chip 'n Dale: Rescue Rangers scored by Brian Tyler.
2022: Williams' Jurassic Park theme used in Jurassic World: Dominion scored by Michael Giacchino.
2022: Williams' Superman theme briefly appears when the destruction of Krypton happens at the beginning of DC League of Super-Pets.
2022: A rendition of Williams' Superman theme composed by Lorne Balfe briefly appears when Superman meets Black Adam in the mid-credits scene of the DC Extended Universe film Black Adam.

Concertos

Celebration pieces and other concert works
 "Prelude and Fugue for Orchestra" (1965). Premiered by the Los Angeles Neophonic Orchestra conducted by Stan Kenton.  The original Kenton version is on the album Stan Kenton Conducts the Los Angeles Neophonic Orchestra. Another recording is available for download in MP3 at the United States Marine Band website.
 "Essay for Strings" (1965)
 "Symphony No. 1" (1966), premiered by Houston Symphony under André Previn in 1968. Williams reworked the piece in 1988 (scheduled to be performed by the San Francisco Symphony during a visit as guest conductor in early 1990s but pulled before the performance).
 "Sinfonietta for Wind Ensemble" (1968), commissioned and first recorded in 1970 by Eastman Wind Ensemble under Donald Hunsberger.
 "A Nostalgic Jazz Odyssey" (1971)
 Thomas and The King (musical, 1975), premiered in London. Recorded in 1981 by the Original Cast.
 "Jubilee 350 Fanfare" (1980), premiered by the Boston Pops conducted by Williams. Piece celebrating the 350th anniversary of the City of Boston
 "Fanfare for a Festive Occasion" (1980), composed for by the Boston Civic Orchestra and its conductor Max Hobart, and premiered on November 14, 1980.
 "Pops on the March" (1981). Composed as a tribute to Arthur Fiedler
 "America, the Dream Goes On" (1982)
 "Esplanade Overture" (1983)
 Liberty Fanfare (1986), premiered on July 4, 1986, by the Boston Pops Esplanade Orchestra. Piece composed for the Liberty Weekend Centennial of the Statue of Liberty
 "Celebration Fanfare" (1986). Composed for the sesquicentennial of the Texas Declaration of Independence
 "A Hymn to New England" (1987)
 "We're Looking Good!" (1987). Composed for the 1987 Special Olympics World Games
 "Fanfare for Michael Dukakis" (1988). Composed for Michael Dukakis' presidential campaign and premiered at the 1988 Democratic National Convention
 "Fanfare for Ten-Year-Olds" (1988)
 "For New York" (Variations on theme by Leonard Bernstein) (1988). Composed for Leonard Bernstein's 70th birthday celebrations
 "Winter Games Fanfare" (1989)
 "Celebrate Discovery!" (1990). Composed for the 500th anniversary celebration of the arrival of Columbus in America
 "Aloft... To the Royal Masthead" (1992), for the visiting Prince Philip, Duke of Edinburgh.
 "Sound the Bells!" (1993), composed in honor of the wedding of Crown Prince Naruhito and Crown Princess Masako.
 "Song for World Peace" (1994)
 "Variations on Happy Birthday" (1995)
 "Satellite Celebration" (1995)
 "Seven for Luck" (1998)
 "American Journey" (1999). Portions premiered as accompaniment to a film by Steven Spielberg as part of the Millennium Celebration in Washington D.C. December 31, 1999
 "For Seiji!" (1999). Tribute to conductor Seiji Ozawa, premiered by the Boston Symphony Orchestra on April 23, 1999
 "Three Pieces for Solo Cello" (2001)
 "Soundings" (2003), composed for the Walt Disney Concert Hall
 "Star Spangled Banner" (2007), special arrangement for game 1 of the 2007 World Series played by the Boston Pops Orchestra
 "A Timeless Call" (2008). Score to the Steven Spielberg war veteran tribute film shown on day 3 of the 2008 Democratic National Convention
 "Air and Simple Gifts", performed by Itzhak Perlman on violin, Yo-Yo Ma on cello, Gabriela Montero on piano, and Anthony McGill on clarinet. Composed for the Barack Obama 2009 presidential inauguration
 "Viktor's Tale" (2010), for clarinet and concert band.  From "The Terminal".
 "La Jolla Quartet: A Chamber Piece for Violin, Cello, Clarinet, and Harp" (2011). Premiered August 2011 at the La Jolla Music Society's SummerFest
 "A Young Person's Guide to the Cello" for solo cello (2011)
 "Fanfare for Fenway" (2012), Premiered April 2012 as part of the Boston Red Sox's commemoration of their 100th anniversary in Fenway Park.
 "Rounds" (2012), for solo guitar - Composed for Spanish guitarist Pablo Sáinz Villegas and premiered in June 2012 at the Parkening International Guitar Competition in Malibu.
 "Fanfare for 'The President's Own'" (2013), Premiered May 2013 for the United States Marine Band's 215th anniversary.
 "Conversations" (2013), a four-movement work for solo piano. The first two movements were premiered by pianist Gloria Cheng on July 22, 2013, at the Mendocino Music Festival in California. She premiered the entire work in November on the Piano Spheres series in Los Angeles. A recording of "Conversations" was released on February 10, 2015, as part of Gloria Cheng's solo album 'Montage'.
"Music for Brass" for Brass Ensemble and Percussion (2014), premiered on June 12 by the National Brass Ensemble.
"A Toast!" (2014), celebrating the arrival of Andris Nelsons as new music director of the Boston Symphony Orchestra.
"Just Down West Street...on the left" (2015), Tanglewood Music Center 75th Anniversary commission.
Theme and ambient music for Star Wars: Galaxy's Edge attractions (2018–2019)
 "Overture to the Oscars", premiered at Tanglewood’s ‘Film Night’ 2021 (August 13)
 "Fanfare for Solo Trumpet", composed for David Geffen Hall Reopening (2022)
 "Centennial Overture", composed in celebration of the 100th Anniversary of the Hollywood Bowl (2022) 
 "Of Grit And Glory", composed or ESPN College Football Championship (2023)

References

Sources

 
Williams, John